Kh. Momota Hena Lovely is a Bangladesh Awami League politician and a Member of the Bangladesh Parliament from a reserved seat.

Career
Lovely was elected to parliament from reserved seat as a Bangladesh Awami League candidate in 2019. She is a member of the Parliamentary Standing Committee on the Ministry of Information.

References

Awami League politicians
Living people
Women members of the Jatiya Sangsad
11th Jatiya Sangsad members
21st-century Bangladeshi women politicians
21st-century Bangladeshi politicians
Year of birth missing (living people)